The Cachoeira da Fumaça State Park is a state park in the state of Espírito Santo, Brazil, known for a dramatic waterfall. Visitors may swim in the pools.

Location

It is accessible by a well-maintained road paved in cobblestone. In the hottest season of the year the park usually has around 3,000 visitors per month.

The original vegetation was semi-deciduous forest, but over the years there were plantations of native oil and fruit trees.
 had been turned into pasture. Regeneration of the forest in the pasture areas has been underway since 2008. With replanting of native species some of the original resident and migratory birds have returned.

The  Cachoeira da Fumaça waterfall on the Braço Norte Direito River, a tributary of the Itapemirim River, attracts thousands of visitors annually due to its great scenic beauty. Visitors may swim in the streams and pools. There are four tracks with different levels of difficulty. The falls are reached by an  walk through the Atlantic Forest. The "smoke" of water droplets has a cooling effect.

History

The Cachoeira da Fumaça State Park was created by state decree 2.791-ES of 24 August 1984, and expanded by decree 4.568-ES of 21 September 1990 when the state, responding to a request from the residents of the municipalities of Alegre, Guaçuí and Castelo, expropriated  of pasture in the interior. It became part of the Central Atlantic Forest Ecological Corridor, created in 2002.

Notes

Sources

State parks of Brazil
Protected areas of Espírito Santo
1984 establishments in Brazil